This article lists notable highest-grossing media franchises that have grossed $2 billion and more. The list includes the total estimated revenue figure and revenue breakdown based on publicly available data.

List

See also
List of best-selling comic series
List of best-selling manga
List of best-selling light novels
List of best-selling video game franchises
List of highest-grossing mobile games
Lists of multimedia franchises
Lists of highest-grossing films
List of best-selling films in the United States
List of films by box office admissions
List of highest-grossing films
List of highest-grossing animated films
List of highest-grossing Japanese films
List of highest-grossing non-English films

Notes

References

Highest-grossing media franchises
Highest-grossing
Highest-grossing media franchises